Nadia Essadiqi, who performs under the stage name La Bronze, is a Moroccan Canadian musician and actress. Although usually singing in French, she is currently best known for her Maghrebi Arabic version of the Stromae hit "Formidable".

As an actress she has appeared in the television series Trauma, season 3 of Ici Radio-Canada Télé's Unité 9, the web series Quart de vie (TOU.TV), the short film Black Forest (Forêt Noire) and the science-fiction Projet-M.

Her first album, La Bronze, was released in September 2014. In 2015, she was nominated "Emerging artist of the year" for the Canadian Music Week Awards. A second album was announced for 2016, and finally released on 3 November 2017.

References

External links

La Bronze YouTube channel.
La Bronze, artist website.

Living people
Year of birth missing (living people)
Canadian people of Moroccan descent
Canadian television actresses
Canadian web series actresses
21st-century Canadian actresses
French-language singers of Canada
Place of birth missing (living people)
Essadiqi, Nadia
21st-century Canadian women singers